Bormann is a German surname. Notable people with the surname include:

Albert Bormann (1902–1989), German Nazi Party official, adjutant to Adolf Hitler
Cheryl Bormann (fl. 2008), American attorney
Edwin Bormann (1851–1912), German writer
Elisabeth Bormann (1895–1986), Austrian physicist
Emma Bormann (1887–1974), Austrian artist
Ernest Bormann (1925–2008), American academic in speech-communication
Ernst Bormann (1897–1960), German World War I flying ace and World War II Luftwaffe general
Eugen Bormann (1842–1917), German-Austrian historian
F. Herbert Bormann (1922–2012), American plant ecologist
John Bormann (born 1993), American baseball player
Juana Bormann (1893–1945), or Johana Bormann, German SS Nazi concentration camp prison guard executed for war crimes
Karin Bormann (born 1954), German Olympic swimmer
Martin Bormann (1900–1945), German Nazi Party official, Adolf Hitler's private secretary
Martin Adolf Bormann (1930–2013), German theologian and Roman Catholic priest, son of Martin Bormann
Michael Bormann (born 1966), German rock vocalist

See also
Borman
Boorman

German-language surnames